The Democratic Party (Albanian: Partia Demokratike, Montenegrin: Democratska Partija, abbr. DP/PD) is a conservative Albanian minority interests political party in Montenegro. Since 2012, he has been a member of the Albanian Coalition, which he leads together with the LDMZ. It is currently represented with one seat in the Parliament of Montenegro, party leader and current MP is Fatmir Gjeka.

History
The party was founded in April 2010 in Ulcinj, its founder and current leader is Fatmir Gjeka, former deputy president of the Democratic Union of Albanians (UDSH, prior party split in early 2010) and former Mayor of Ulcinj (2008-2011).  

The party was part of the Albanian Coalition since its foundation in 2012. In 2020, the PD agreed to re-join Democratic Union of Albanians, by forming a pre-election coalition for 2020 Montenegrin parliamentary election. 

The new Albanian Coalition (PD-LDMZ-UDSH) won 1.14% of the vote and gained a singular seat in the Parliament of Montenegro, which belonged to the Democratic Party leader Fatmir Gjeka.

Electoral results

Parliamentary elections

References

Conservative parties in Montenegro
National conservative parties
Albanian political parties in Montenegro
Pro-European political parties in Montenegro